Domecq is a Spanish family name. It may refer to:

 Allied Domecq, a former British wine and spirits company
 Álvaro Domecq y Díez, fighter pilot, bullfighting promoter and member of the Spanish sherry family
 Juan Domecq, a former basketball player from Cuba
 Alcina Lubitch Domecq, a Jewish Guatemalan short story writer
 H. Bustos Domecq, a pseudonym used for several collaborative works by the Argentine writers Jorge Luis Borges and Adolfo Bioy Casares.